Félix Alexander Bautista (born June 20, 1995) is a Dominican professional baseball pitcher for the Baltimore Orioles of Major League Baseball (MLB). He was signed by the Miami Marlins as an international free agent in 2012. He made his MLB debut in 2022.

Career

Miami Marlins
Bautista signed with the Miami Marlins as an international free agent on November 19, 2012. Bautista made his professional debut for the Dominican Summer League Marlins in 2013, logging a 2.73 earned run average (ERA) with 17 strikeouts in 11 appearances. In 2014, Bautista pitched to a 12.41 ERA with seven strikeouts in  innings pitched across eight games. He was released by the Marlins organization on January 15, 2015.

Baltimore Orioles
After not playing professionally in 2015, on August 4, 2016, Bautista signed a minor league contract with the Baltimore Orioles organization. He was assigned to the Dominican Summer League Orioles, where he made 5 appearances to finish the year. Bautista returned to the DSL Orioles in 2017, posting a 4–3 record and 2.01 ERA with 75 strikeouts in 15 appearances (14 of them starts). He spent the 2018 season with the Gulf Coast League Orioles, pitching to a 4.33 ERA with 30 strikeouts in 27.0 innings of work across 12 appearances. Bautista split the 2019 season between the Low-A Aberdeen IronBirds and the Single-A Delmarva Shorebirds, accumulating a 3.44 ERA with 48 strikeouts in 26 total appearances between the two affiliates. Bautista did not play in a game in 2020 due to the cancellation of the minor league season because of the reaction to the COVID-19 pandemic. He spent the 2021 season with three different Orioles affiliates: High-A Aberdeen, the Double-A Bowie Baysox, and the Triple-A Norfolk Tides. In 40 appearances between the three levels, Bautista posted a stellar 1.54 ERA with 77 strikeouts in  innings pitched.

The Orioles added him to their 40-man roster following the 2021 season on November 19, 2021. Bautista made the Opening Day roster for the Orioles out of Spring Training in 2022. He made his major league debut on April 10, 2022, pitching in relief of Tyler Wells. In the game, he recorded his first major league strikeout against Tampa Bay Rays shortstop Wander Franco. On May 10, Bautista earned his first career save, closing out a 5–3 victory over the St. Louis Cardinals. When the Orioles traded Jorge López, Bautista succeeded him as the Orioles' closer.

See also
 List of Major League Baseball players from the Dominican Republic

References

External links

1995 births
Living people
Sportspeople from Santo Domingo
Dominican Republic expatriate baseball players in the United States
Major League Baseball players from the Dominican Republic
Major League Baseball pitchers
Baltimore Orioles players
Dominican Summer League Marlins players
Dominican Summer League Orioles players
Gulf Coast Orioles players
Aberdeen IronBirds players
Delmarva Shorebirds players
Bowie Baysox players
Norfolk Tides players
Leones del Escogido players